The Big Springs Lookout Tower is a fire lookout tower in Kaibab National Forest near Big Springs, Arizona. The tower was built in 1934 for the U.S. Forest Service by contractors from Kanab, Utah. A wood-frame cabin is located near the base of the tower; the cabin was built in 1959 to replace an older log cabin.

The tower was listed on the National Register of Historic Places in 1988.

See also
 Big Springs Ranger Station

References

External links

 

Fire lookout towers on the National Register of Historic Places in Arizona
Government buildings completed in 1934
Towers completed in 1934
Buildings and structures in Coconino County, Arizona
Kaibab National Forest
1934 establishments in Arizona
National Register of Historic Places in Coconino County, Arizona